WTVA (channel 9) is a television station licensed to Tupelo, Mississippi, United States, serving the Columbus–Tupelo market as an affiliate of NBC and ABC. It is owned by Allen Media Broadcasting, which provides certain services to West Point–licensed Fox affiliate WLOV-TV (channel 27) under a local marketing agreement (LMA) with Coastal Television Broadcasting Company. The two stations share studios on Beech Springs Road (County Road 681) in Saltillo; WTVA's transmitter is located in Woodland, Mississippi.

History

WTWV
WTVA was the brainchild of Frank K. Spain, an engineering graduate of Mississippi State University, who had helped build NBC-owned station WNBW (now WRC-TV) in Washington, D.C. While serving as Technical Director at WHEN-TV (now WTVH) in Syracuse, New York in the early-1950s, he dreamed of bringing a television station to Tupelo, where he had spent most of his childhood. Spain applied for a license in 1953 which was granted by the Federal Communications Commission (FCC) in 1956. The station began airing on March 18, 1957 with the call letters WTWV. Its equipment (antenna, transmitter, cameras, etc.) was hand-built in Spain's garage, backyard, and basement in Syracuse.

Spain hoped to parlay his good relations with NBC officials into getting his new station an affiliation with the network. However, several NBC executives believed Tupelo was not a desirable place for a local station because of its rural location, even though most viewers in northern Mississippi could only get NBC via grade B coverage from WMC-TV in Memphis, Tennessee, WLBT in Jackson, Mississippi, and WAPI-TV (now WVTM-TV) in Birmingham, Alabama. Nonetheless, they told Spain that if he could figure out a way to obtain a network signal, he could carry it.

Spain allegedly negotiated under-the-table deals with WMC-TV and set up a network of microwave relays and repeater systems to carry the WMC-TV signal to Tupelo. Station engineers then switched to and from the signal when network programming aired. This setup, necessary in the days before satellites, enabled WTWV to bring NBC programming to northeastern Mississippi and northwestern Alabama. The station also carried a secondary affiliation with ABC (which apparently necessitated the use of WHBQ-TV, now a Fox affiliate).

In the mid-1960s, WTWV was approached by ABC about becoming a full affiliate of that network. Spain, who was still receiving "bootleg" NBC programming, told NBC executives about ABC's offer to pay him the customary rates. This prompted NBC to finally negotiate a formal deal with Spain, which made WTWV an official NBC affiliate–one of only three primary NBC affiliates in Mississippi at the time. It still carried some ABC programming in off-hours (namely, college football on Saturdays) until WVSB (now WLOV) in nearby West Point began operating in 1983. Starting in 1972, WTWV operated a full-time satellite for eastern central Mississippi, WHTV (now WMDN) in Meridian on channel 24; WHTV operated as such until 1980, when Spain decided to make it a stand-alone station, with a CBS affiliation. WTWV built a new tower in the 1970s that not only brought a city-grade signal to Columbus for the first time, but gave the station one of the largest coverage areas in the country.

WTVA
On July 4, 1979, WTWV changed its call letters to "WTVA" to reinforce its identity, not only as the first TVA city, but also its then-current branding of "TV Alive". The WTWV call sign was later used on WFRQ, a radio station in Mashpee, Massachusetts on Cape Cod. The WTWV call sign is now in use by a Memphis-based TV station. Neither the Massachusetts nor the Memphis station are related to the current WTVA.

Frank Spain served as CEO of WTVA, Inc. until his death on April 25, 2006. He continued to visit the station regularly well into his seventies. His widow Jane assumed the CEO position until the station was sold in September 2014. The outlet was the first commercial television station in Mississippi to devote its entire morning broadcast schedule to educational programming. The station also made history as the first in Mississippi to broadcast a live basketball game. In the late 1990s, WTVA launched a low-powered translator, W22BS, which served as a primary UPN affiliate, before selling the station to rival WCBI in 2002. The Spains continued to own WHTV/WMDN until it was sold to Meridian Media (now Waypoint Media) in January 2008.

Although WTVA operates WLOV through local marketing agreement (LMA), and previously operated ABC affiliate WKDH through a similar arrangement from its 2001 sign-on until its final sign-off on August 31, 2012, each station has its own station manager and owner in accordance with FCC policy. WTVA, Inc. also previously owned and operated WTVX in Fort Pierce, Florida and KTFL in Flagstaff, Arizona. During the majority of the time KTFL was broadcasting, it carried programing from FamilyNet. KTFL's transmitter was licensed as the most powerful television station its own market. On July 30, 1999, WTVA began its digital service on UHF channel 57 but is mapped via PSIP to virtual channel 9, that service would move to VHF channel 8 on July 24, 2008. By comparison, sister station WLOV broadcasts network programming in high definition over a low-powered digital transmitter. It is likely the allowable power levels on channel 8, WTVA's post-transition digital channel, will be severely limited due to potential interference to other stations.

Previously, FamilyNet was carried on WTVA-DT2 until December 31, 2011, when it was replaced by MeTV. The subchannel again switched affiliations, this time to ABC, on September 1, 2012; the subchannel replaced WKDH as the ABC affiliate for the Columbus-Tupelo-West Point market, which ceased operations the night before on August 31. The MeTV affiliation was moved to sister-station WLOV-DT 27.2.

Heartland Media announced on September 16, 2014 that it would purchase WTVA from the Spain family, ending 57 years of local ownership. Heartland Media assumed control of the station on February 11, 2015. Allen Media Broadcasting, in turn, purchased Heartland in 2020, bringing WTVA into its portfolio.

Digital television

Digital channels
The station's digital signal is multiplexed:

Programming
Syndicated programming on the station includes Wheel of Fortune, Dr. Phil, Inside Edition, and Jeopardy!.

Newscasts
In March 2000, WTVA began producing a Sunday through Friday night prime time newscast on WLOV-TV. Currently known as WTVA 9 News on WLOV, this broadcast can be seen for an hour on weekdays and half an hour on weekends. That newscast was expanded to seven nights a week on July 1, 2017. WLOV also airs WTVA 9 News on WLOV from 6-9 a.m., produced by WTVA that competes with a sixty-minute show seen on The CW affiliate WCBI-DT3. On April 20, 2009, WTVA became the first station in the market and second in the state to upgrade local news to high definition level (WLOV's show was included). Compared nationwide, it was the smallest market outlet that made the change.

With the addition of ABC network programming on WTVA-DT2, the subchannel also airs local news programming as per the terms of its affiliation agreement, featuring simulcasts of most local newscasts seen on the primary channel. More specifically, WTVA's half-hour weekday newscasts at noon and 6 p.m. and its one-hour news and talk program Kay Bain's Saturday Mornin' Show is not seen on WTVA-DT2. WTVA-DT2 does, however, air an exclusive newscast weeknights at 6:30 p.m. The station operates a weather radar at its facilities that is known on-air as "StormTrack Doppler". WTVA's Weather Authority made national news on April 28, 2014 when chief meteorologist Matt Laubhan escorted the station's crew to the basement when an EF3 tornado struck nearby. After calling the National Weather Service in Memphis and operating without any radar data for three hours, he later won an Emmy in 2015 for his efforts.

References

Oral History with Mr. Frank Kyle Spain
History of WTVA

External links

Entertainment Studios
Television channels and stations established in 1957
TVA
NBC network affiliates
1957 establishments in Mississippi
Ion Television affiliates